The Bank of Commerce building is a historic commercial building at 200 North Washington Street in El Dorado, Arkansas.  The Classical Revival two story brick building was constructed in 1919–20, and is one of the few buildings in El Dorado's downtown that retains its historical facade from that period.  The building was renovated in the 1940s and 1950s, actions that gutted its interior, but only covered over the main facade with a new layer of brick, and left the secondary southern facade intact.  In the early 1980s the building's exterior was restored to its 1920s appearance.

The building was listed on the National Register of Historic Places in 1982.  It was included in the El Dorado Commercial Historic District in 2003.

See also
National Register of Historic Places listings in Union County, Arkansas

References

Bank buildings on the National Register of Historic Places in Arkansas
Neoclassical architecture in Arkansas
Banks established in 1920
Buildings and structures in El Dorado, Arkansas
Individually listed contributing properties to historic districts on the National Register in Arkansas
National Register of Historic Places in Union County, Arkansas
1920 establishments in Arkansas